Communist Party of the Valencian Country (Revolutionary Marxist) (in ), was the regional affiliate of the Communist Party of Spain (Revolutionary Marxist) in the Valencian Community, Spain. This party disappeared when it merged with Spanish Socialist Workers' Party.

Valencia, Communist Party of the Valencian Country - Revolutionary Marxist
Political parties in the Valencian Community